Richard Hart (born October 14, 1968) is a Canadian curler from Pickering, Ontario. He is a Brier and world champion, as well as an Olympic silver medallist.

He currently coaches the Mike McEwen rink.

Career
Hart attended his first Brier in 1995 as an alternate for Ed Werenich. It was his only major tournament experience before winning the 1997 Canadian Olympic trials as the third for the Mike Harris team. At the 1998 Winter Olympics, the team won a silver medal. He left the team in 2000, and joined up with Glenn Howard. Eventually with Howard, Hart would go to another Brier, in 2006 where they lost in the final. The following year, they won the 2007 Tim Hortons Brier and then the 2007 Ford World Men's Curling Championship. As vice with Glenn Howard he placed 2nd in the Olympic trials in Edmonton in 2009 and is a runner up for the past 3 Briers. He is nicknamed "the Hart Surgeon" for his ability to make difficult shots under pressure. He was the 2011 winner of the annual Ford Hot Shots skills and shot-making competition that precedes the start of play at the Brier.

After the 2010-11 curling season, Hart announced that he was going to retire from high-performance curling. He leaves the world of curling after spending his career playing as third under Mike Harris for ten years and under Glenn Howard for eleven years.

For the 2014-15 curling season, Hart announced that he was going to return from his retirement and continue to curl for the Glenn Howard rink.

Personal life
Hart works as a Principal for Hart-Well Electrical Company Limited. His work and job influenced his decision to leave competitive curling the first time he retired. Hart is married and has three children, including Joseph (Joey), the alternate on his 2016 Brier team.

Teams

Notes

References

External links
 

Curlers at the 1998 Winter Olympics
Olympic silver medalists for Canada
People from Pickering, Ontario
Curlers from Toronto
1968 births
Living people
World curling champions
Brier champions
Olympic medalists in curling
Medalists at the 1998 Winter Olympics
Canadian curling coaches
Canadian male curlers
Canada Cup (curling) participants